Rednic is a Romanian surname. Notable people with the surname include:

Atanasie Rednic (1722–1772), Romanian bishop 
Daniel Rednic (born 1978), Romanian football player
Mircea Rednic (born 1962), Romanian football manager and former defender 

Romanian-language surnames